Hugh Percy may refer to:

 Hugh Percy, 1st Duke of Northumberland (c. 1714–1786), English peer, landowner and art patron
 Hugh Percy, 2nd Duke of Northumberland (1742–1817), British army officer and British peer
 Hugh Percy, 3rd Duke of Northumberland (1785–1847), British aristocrat and Tory politician
 Hugh Percy (bishop) (1784–1856), British churchman, bishop of Rochester and bishop of Carlisle
 Hugh Percy, 10th Duke of Northumberland (1914–1988)